Robert Doyle (27 December 1953 – 26 February 2019) was a Scottish professional footballer who played as a central midfielder.

Early life
Doyle was born in Dumbarton in 1953.

Career
Having previously played in Scottish junior football, Doyle signed for English side Barnsley in December 1972. After winning Barnsley's Player of the Year award and being named in the PFA’s Fourth Division team of the season for the 1974–75 season, he signed for Peterborough United in July 1976 for a fee of £20,000. He moved to Blackpool in 1979 for a fee of £110,000, making 49 league appearances and scoring two goals, before joining Portsmouth in December 1980 for a £75,000 fee, winning the Third Division championship in 1983. A move to Hull City followed two years later where he established himself in midfield during the club's promotion bid in 1985-86, before a broken leg in a pre-season friendly against Doncaster Rovers in July 1986 effectively ended his career, with Doyle retiring in 1987.

Later life
Following his retirement, Doyle settled in Peterborough and lived and worked there up until his death. He died on 26 February 2019, at the age of 65.

References

External links
Career Stats

1953 births
2019 deaths
Sportspeople from Dumbarton
Footballers from West Dunbartonshire
Scottish footballers
Barnsley F.C. players
Peterborough United F.C. players
Blackpool F.C. players
Portsmouth F.C. players
Hull City A.F.C. players
Association football midfielders